Devargudihal is a village in Dharwad district of Karnataka, India.

Demographics
As of the 2011 Census of India there were 586 households in Devanur and a total population of 3,111 consisting of 1,631 males and 1,480 females. There were 392 children ages 0-6.

References

Villages in Dharwad district